South Carolina Highway 151 (SC 151) is a  primary state highway in the U.S. state of South Carolina. Known as "the road to the beach" by many residents of the Charlotte metropolitan area due to it being the most direct route to the Grand Strand, it connects the Charlotte metropolitan area to Darlington, Florence, and the aforementioned Grand Strand.

Route description

SC 151 is a four-lane and mostly divided highway from Darlington to Pageland. For several segments, the road is five lanes, with four travel lanes and a center turn lane. 

SC 151 starts in Pageland, splitting off from US 601 to bypass the town's business district. Heading southward, it also bypasses Jefferson, heads through downtown McBee, and bypasses Hartsville. In downtown McBee, the speed limit is 25 MPH, and on several segments of the route, the limit is 60 MPH. Past McBee, the route takes on a more east-west direction, which it maintains until its southern terminus in Darlington.

History

The first SC 151 was established in 1927 as a new primary routing between U.S. Route 29 (US 29)/SC 15 in Anderson, to SC 20 in Williamston. By 1930, it was renumbered as SC 248.

The current SC 151 was established in 1937 as a renumbering of SC 35 from Darlington to the North Carolina state line. By 1952, SC 151 was truncated at SC 9 in Pageland, its route north to the state line replaced by US 601. By 1958, SC 151 replaced SC 151 Alternate (SC 151 Alt.), bypassing Hartsville. In 1983, SC 151 was extended and bypassed east of Pageland, to its current northern terminus. In 1997, SC 151 was bypassed east of Jefferson.

South Carolina Highway 35

South Carolina Highway 35 (SC 35) was an original state highway that was established at least as early as 1922 from SC 41 (now US 52 Bus.) in Darlington, through Hartsville, to SC 50 (now US 1) in McBee. In 1923, it was extended through Jefferson to SC 9 in Pageland. By the end of 1926, it was extended again to the North Carolina state line, at a point north-northwest of Pageland. In 1938, it was decommissioned and redesignated as SC 151.

Major intersections

Special routes

Hartsville alternate route

South Carolina Highway 151 Alternate (SC 151 Alt.) was an alternate route established in 1954 as a new primary route bypassing south of Hartsville. In 1972 or 1973, it was renumbered as SC 151 Business.

Hartsville business loop

South Carolina Highway 151 Business (SC 151 Bus.) is a  business route that travels through downtown Hartsville. It was established by 1958 as a renumbering of mainline SC 151. It follows Fourth Street and Carolina Avenue.

Jefferson business loop

South Carolina Highway 151 Business (SC 151 Bus.) is a  business route that follows Main Street through downtown Jefferson. It was established by 1997 as a renumbering of mainline SC 151.

Pageland business loop

South Carolina Highway 151 Business (SC 151 Bus.) is a  business route that travels through downtown Pageland via Pearl Street. It also has a concurrency with U.S. Route 601 (US 601). It was established in 1983 as renumbering of mainline SC 151.

See also

References

External links

SC 151 at Virginia Highway's South Carolina Highways Annex
Former SC 151 Alternate at Virginia Highway's South Carolina Highways Annex
SC 151 Business at Virginia Highway's South Carolina Highways Annex

151
Transportation in Darlington County, South Carolina
Transportation in Chesterfield County, South Carolina